Sakie Tachibana Fukushima is a Japanese business executive.

Biography 
Fukushima completed a Bachelor of Arts degree at Seisen University in 1972, followed by a master's in education at Harvard University in 1978. She also completed an MBA degree at Stanford University in 1987. Fukushima worked at Harvard University as a Japanese language teacher, and in 1991 joined Korn/Ferry International. She later became the regional managing director for the company and then the chair of Korn/Ferry Japan.

She is an independent director on the boards of Kao Corporation, Sony Corporation, Benesse, Bridgestone, Ajinomoto, Mitsubishi Corporation and J. Front Retailing. In 2003, she was appointed executive director of the Japan Association of Corporate Executives. In 2019, when she was appointed a director on the board of Konica Minolta, she was the first woman to be appointed to the company's board.

References 

Living people
Harvard Graduate School of Education alumni
Stanford Graduate School of Business alumni
Year of birth missing (living people)
Place of birth missing (living people)
Japanese business executives
20th-century Japanese businesspeople
21st-century Japanese businesspeople
Japanese women business executives